Medical Examination of Young Persons (Underground Work) Convention, 1965 is  an International Labour Organization Convention.

It was established in 1965, with the preamble stating:
Having decided upon the adoption of certain proposals with regard to medical examination of young persons for fitness for employment underground in mines,...

Ratifications
As of 2022, the convention had been ratified by 41 states.

External links 
Text.
Ratifications.

International Labour Organization conventions
Youth rights
Treaties concluded in 1965
Treaties entered into force in 1967
Mining treaties
Treaties of Argentina
Treaties of Austria
Treaties of Azerbaijan
Treaties of the Byelorussian Soviet Socialist Republic
Treaties of Belgium
Treaties of Bolivia
Treaties of the military dictatorship in Brazil
Treaties of the People's Republic of Bulgaria
Treaties of Cyprus
Treaties of Czechoslovakia
Treaties of the Czech Republic
Treaties of Djibouti
Treaties of Ecuador
Treaties of Finland
Treaties of France
Treaties of Gabon
Treaties of Greece
Treaties of Guatemala
Treaties of the Hungarian People's Republic
Treaties of Ireland
Treaties of Italy
Treaties of Jordan
Treaties of Kyrgyzstan
Treaties of Madagascar
Treaties of Malta
Treaties of Mexico
Treaties of the Netherlands
Treaties of Panama
Treaties of Paraguay
Treaties of the Polish People's Republic
Treaties of Portugal
Treaties of Slovakia
Treaties of Francoist Spain
Treaties of the Soviet Union
Treaties of Syria
Treaties of Tajikistan
Treaties of Tunisia
Treaties of Uganda
Treaties of the Ukrainian Soviet Socialist Republic
Treaties of the United Kingdom
Treaties of Vietnam
Treaties of Zambia
Treaties extended to Swaziland (protectorate)
Occupational safety and health treaties
1965 in labor relations